Ginglymostoma is a genus of shark in the family Ginglymostomatidae. There are two members in the genus. Members of this genus eat small fish and crustaceans, and are commonly quite lethargic unless provoked. Members of this genus have the ability to suck in water in order to remove snails from their shells in a manner that can be described as 'vacuum-like'.

Distribution
This shark lives in Brazil, the United States, Colombia, Ecuador, Cape Verde, Morocco, Mauritania, Senegal, the Gambia, Guinea-Bissau, Guinea, Sierra Leone, Liberia, Ivory Coast, Ghana, Togo, Benin, Nigeria, Cameroon, Equatorial Guinea, Republic of the Congo, Angola, the Democratic Republic of the Congo, Gabon, France, Spain, Nicaragua, Saint Lucia, Guatemala, Saint Vincent and the Grenadines, Guyana, Grenada, Suriname, French Guiana, Trinidad and Tobago, Dominica, Martinique, Dominican Republic, Costa Rica, Honduras, Haiti, Jamaica, Puerto Rico, El Salvador, Saint Kitts and Nevis, Turks and Caicos Islands, Guadeloupe, Montserrat, Antigua and Barbuda, Belize, Anguilla, Virgin Islands, Venezuela, Saint Martin, Sint Eustatius, Bonaire, Barbados, Bermuda, Aruba, Mexico, Cayman Islands, and Peru.

Species
There are currently two recognized extant species in this genus, and numerous extinct species:
†Ginglymostoma angolense (Dartevelle & Casier, 1943)
†Ginglymostoma botmaense Noubhani & Cappetta, 1997
†Ginglymostoma chenanei Noubhani & Cappetta, 1997
Ginglymostoma cirratum Bonnaterre, 1788 (nurse shark)
†Ginglymostoma cuspidata Case, Borodin & Leggett, 2001
†Ginglymostoma dartevellei Casier, 1946
†Ginglymostoma delfortriei Daimeries, 1889
†Ginglymostoma erramii Noubhani & Cappetta, 1997
†Ginglymostoma khouribgaense Noubhani & Cappetta, 1997
†Ginglymostoma maghrebianum Casier, 1947
†Ginglymostoma malembeense Dartevelle & Casier, 1943
†Ginglymostoma maroccanum Noubhani & Cappetta, 1997
†Ginglymostoma serra Leidy, 1877
†Ginglymostoma sokotoense White, 1934
†Ginglymostoma subafricanum Arambourg, 1952
Ginglymostoma unami Del-Moral-Flores, Ramírez-Antonio, Angulo & Pérez-Ponce de León, 2015 (Pacific nurse shark)

References

Ginglymostomatidae
Ovoviviparous fish
Shark genera
Taxa named by Johannes Peter Müller
Taxa named by Friedrich Gustav Jakob Henle
Albian life
Cenomanian life
Turonian life
Santonian life
Campanian life
Maastrichtian life
Selandian life
Thanetian life
Ypresian life
Lutetian life
Bartonian life
Priabonian life
Rupelian life
Aquitanian life
Burdigalian life
Langhian life
Tortonian life
Messinian life
Zanclean life
Piacenzian life
Ionian life
Tarantian life
Danian genera
Extant Albian first appearances